Kang Fei (born August 1957) is a vice admiral (zhong jiang) of the Chinese People's Liberation Army Navy (PLAN). He has been deputy political commissar of Northern Theater Command and political commissar of the East Sea Fleet (Northern Theater Command Navy) between 2015 and 2020.

Biography
Kang Fei was born in Haidian District of Beijing in August 1957. He was political commissar of the Third Detachment of the East Sea Fleet before serving as political commissar of PLAN Dalian Naval Academy in 2008. In April 2012 he was commissioned as political commissar of Logistics Department of the People's Liberation Army Navy, and held that office until March 2015, when he was appointed deputy director of Political Department of the People's Liberation Army Navy. In July 2015, he became deputy political commissar of Jinan Military Region and political commissar of North Sea Fleet. When the North Sea Fleet was reorganized as the Northern Theater Command Navy in February 2016, he became political commissar of the Northern Theater Command Navy and deputy political commissar of the Northern Theater Command.

Kang Fei attained the rank of rear admiral in July 2010, and vice admiral in July 2016.

References

1957 births
People's Liberation Army generals from Beijing
Living people
People's Liberation Army Navy admirals